The canton of Oloron-Sainte-Marie-1 is an administrative division of the Pyrénées-Atlantiques department, southwestern France. It was created at the French canton reorganisation which came into effect in March 2015. Its seat is in Oloron-Sainte-Marie.

It consists of the following communes:
 
Accous
Agnos
Ance Féas
Aramits
Aren
Arette
Asasp-Arros
Aydius
Bedous
Bidos
Borce
Cette-Eygun
Escot
Esquiule
Etsaut
Eysus
Géronce
Geüs-d'Oloron
Gurmençon
Issor
Lanne-en-Barétous
Lées-Athas
Lescun
Lourdios-Ichère
Lurbe-Saint-Christau
Moumour
Oloron-Sainte-Marie (partly)
Orin
Osse-en-Aspe
Préchacq-Josbaig
Saint-Goin
Sarrance
Urdos

References

Cantons of Pyrénées-Atlantiques